Cathay Williams (September 1844 – 1893) was an American soldier. A Black woman, she enlisted in the United States Army under the pseudonym William Cathay. Williams became the first female African American to enlist and the only documented woman to serve in the U.S. Army while posing as a man during the Indian Wars.

Early life
Cathay Williams was born in September 1844 in  Independence, Missouri to a free man and a woman in slavery, making her legal status also that of a slave. During her adolescence, Williams worked as a house slave on the Johnson plantation on the outskirts of Jefferson City, Missouri. In 1861 Union forces occupied Jefferson City in the early stages of the Civil War. At that time, captured slaves officially were designated by the Union as contraband, and many were forced to serve in military support roles such as cooks, laundresses, or nurses.

American Civil War
It is possible that Cathay Williams was present at the Battle of Pea Ridge and the Red River Campaign. There is no evidence  that supports any claims to her service in the Civil War, but a soldier named Finis Cathay did enlist in the 32nd Missouri Infantry as early as 1862 and participated in most of the major campaigns in the west, including the Siege of Vicksburg and Sherman's March to the Sea, as well as helped force Joseph E. Johnston's last Confederate Army into surrender in North Carolina. This unit's history parallels many of the wartime stories told of Cathay Williams, including its presence in Washington, D.C., at the final Grand Review on May 24, 1865.

U.S. Army service

Because of the prohibition against women serving in the military, Cathay Williams enlisted in the United States Regular Army under the false name of William Cathay on November 15, 1866 at St. Louis, Missouri for a three-year engagement, passing herself off as a man. She was assigned to the 38th United States Infantry Regiment after she passed a cursory medical examination. Only two others are known to have been privy to the deception, her cousin and a friend, both of whom were fellow soldiers in her regiment.

Shortly after her enlistment, Williams contracted smallpox, was hospitalized and later rejoined her unit, which by then was posted in New Mexico. Possibly due to the effects of smallpox, the New Mexico heat, or the cumulative effects of years of marching, her body began to show signs of strain. She frequently was hospitalized. The post surgeon finally discovered she was a woman and informed the post commander. She was discharged from the Army by her commanding officer, Captain Charles E. Clarke, on October 14, 1868.

Post-military service years
Cathay Williams worked as a cook at Fort Union, New Mexico and later moved to Pueblo, Colorado. She married, but it ended disastrously when her husband stole her money and a team of horses. Williams had him arrested. 

She moved to Trinidad, Colorado, where she worked as a seamstress. She may also have owned a boarding house. It was at this time that Williams' story first became public. A reporter from St. Louis heard rumors of an African-American woman who had served in the army, and he came to interview her. Her life and military service narrative was published in The St. Louis Daily Times on January 2, 1876.

In late 1889 or early 1890, Williams entered a local hospital where she remained for some time, and in June 1891, applied for a disability pension based on her military service. The nature of her illness and disability are unknown. There was precedent for granting a pension to female soldiers. Deborah Sampson in 1816, Anna Maria Lane, and Mary Hayes McCauley (better known as Molly Pitcher) had been granted pensions for their service in the American Revolutionary War.

Declining health and death
In September 1892, a doctor employed by the U.S. Pension Bureau examined Cathay Williams. Despite the fact that she suffered from neuralgia and diabetes, resulting in the amputation of her toes, and could only walk with a crutch, the doctor decided she did not qualify for disability payments. Her application was rejected.

The exact date of Williams' death is unknown, but it is assumed she died shortly after being denied a pension, probably sometime in 1893. Her grave marker is likely to have been made of wood and deteriorated long ago. Thus her final resting place is unknown.

Honors
In 2016, a bronze bust of Cathay Williams, featuring information about her and with a small rose garden around it, was unveiled outside the Richard Allen Cultural Center in Leavenworth, Kansas.

In 2018, the Private Cathay Williams monument bench was unveiled on the Walk of Honor at the National Infantry Museum.

See also

African-American firsts
List of wartime crossdressers
The Harder They Fall, a 2021 revisionist Western film in which Danielle Deadwyler portrays Cuffee, a transgender man modeled after Williams.

References

Sources

 Cathay Williams: Female Buffalo Soldier Archived from the original. Sources pertaining to Cathay Williams' life compiled by the National Park Service

Further reading

External links
African Americans in the U.S. Army, Profiles of Bravery: Cathay Williams – U.S. Army website
 An Exceptional Woman. Female Buffalo Soldier—With Documents. Cathay Williams or William Cathay (Cathey), Private, Thirty-eighth U.S. Infantry, 1866-1868

1844 births
1892 deaths
African-American female military personnel
People from Independence, Missouri
African Americans in the American Old West
African Americans in the American Civil War
African-American chefs
19th-century American slaves
Buffalo Soldiers
People of Missouri in the American Civil War
People of the American Old West
Female wartime cross-dressers in the American Civil War
19th-century African-American women
African-American United States Army personnel